Pedro Henrique Alves de Almeida (born 8 November 1996), commonly known as Pedro Henrique, is a Brazilian professional footballer who plays as a forward for Portuguese side Farense in the Liga Portugal 2.

Career statistics

Club

Notes

References

1996 births
Living people
Sportspeople from Goiás
Brazilian footballers
Brazilian expatriate footballers
Association football forwards
Campeonato Brasileiro Série A players
Campeonato Brasileiro Série D players
Primeira Liga players
Liga Portugal 2 players
Anápolis Futebol Clube players
Atlético Clube Goianiense players
Grêmio Esportivo Anápolis players
Leixões S.C. players
S.L. Benfica B players
C.D. Feirense players
S.C. Farense players
Brazilian expatriate sportspeople in Portugal
Expatriate footballers in Portugal